Discovery Green is an  public urban park in Downtown Houston, Texas, bounded by La Branch Street to the west, McKinney Street to the north, Avenida de las Americas to the east, and Lamar Street to the south. The park is adjacent to the George R. Brown Convention Center and Avenida Houston entertainment district. Discovery Green features a lake, bandstands and venues for public performances, two dog runs, a playground, and multiple recreational lawns.

In the early 2000s, a public–private partnership between the City of Houston and a group of local philanthropic organizations, including the Kinder Foundation, was formed with the goal of constructing a new public green space in Downtown. This partnership financed the purchase of a series of surface parking lots on the east side of Downtown. Following the completion of land purchases in 2004, the Discovery Green Conservancy and the City jointly raised $125 million to construct the park. The design of the park, led by landscape architecture firm Hargreaves Associates, began in 2005. Discovery Green's public opening occurred on April 13, 2008; during the first two months of operation, an estimated 250,000 people visited the park.

History

The City of Houston acquired a portion of the land in front of the George R. Brown Convention Center in 2002.  When the rest of the property went up for sale, a group of philanthropists led by Maconda Brown O’Connor of the Brown Foundation, and Nancy G. Kinder of the Kinder Foundation approached then-Mayor Bill White with their idea of turning the space into an urban park. The Mayor agreed and became a strong advocate of a public-private partnership was developed for the $125 million project. Several other philanthropic foundations joined the effort, including the Wortham Foundation and the Houston Endowment, Inc.
 
The City of Houston purchased the remainder of the land in 2004 and created the framework for the park’s construction and operations, including the role of the new organization, Discovery Green Conservancy, incorporated in 2004.

When the Houston City Council approved the contracts to provide partial funding and support to the park, it also mandated that the “public at large” be engaged in the design and development of the park. With the guidance of Project for Public Spaces, the Conservancy mounted the large public meetings and smaller focus groups to solicit public feedback. This feedback became the basis for the park’s programming.

Hargreaves Associates, an internationally renowned landscape architecture firm based in San Francisco, oversaw the design effort. Page [formerly PageSoutherlandPage] designed the park's architecture and Larry Speck was their lead architect. Lauren Griffith Associates. provided landscape and horticultural design services. Artists Margo Sawyer and Doug Hollis were integral members of the design team and produced three works of art for the park. A large team of local and international engineers and specialists supported the core design team. Elmore Public Relations was contracted for marketing and public relations.

Ever since the opening in 2008, the park has added upon. An estimate of $1 billion worth of buildings, offices, hotels, and housing projects were added to the park's surroundings.

In 2009 the One Park Place opened. A high-end residential tower that houses 346 units. On 2011, the Hess Tower was built, a 29-story office building. On 2016, the Marriott Marquis convention hotel was built north of the park. A hotel that holds over 1,000 rooms.

The park earned LEED certification in October 2009.

The Kinder Foundation provided $10 million to help fund the $125 million project.

In 2020, the chain opened a new location within the Katy/Fulshear district.

Design Process 
Hargreaves Associates and their team of architects, engineers, and artists took thirteen months to design and finalize the park. Notable challenges would be the dense intersection and the intricate design of implementing the garage with the surface park.

The park is placed in the center of two juxtaposing cross axes.

The linear plaza is lined by a multitude Mexican Sycamore trees and uniquely designed pavement.

Due to the straight nature of the path, it supports farmers markets, art fairs and parades.

Park features

 Anheuser-Busch Stage - a performance stage
 Jones Lawn - a  grass lawn for lounging, offering views of the skyline
 The Brown Foundation Promenade - a shaded walkway, lined with 100-year-old live oak trees
 Wortham Foundation Gardens -  of flowering trees, plants, fountains and works of art
 Kinder Lake - a  lake lined with native wetland plants
 Gateway Fountain - The fountain offers a view of water activity atop a sloping granite surface to the park
 The Natural Gardens - wetland and upland gardens extending the length of the park
 The Landforms - several sculpted grassy knolls with views of downtown Houston
 McNair Foundation Jogging Trail - tree-shaded promenades on which to stroll to the lake and children’s area
 Maconda's Grove - where persons can play bocce on the Carruth Foundation Bocce Courts
 The John P. McGovern Playground, renovated in 2021
 Hagstette Putting Green
 Two dog runs - one for large dogs and another for smaller dogs with seating areas for their owners
 Approximately 630-car underground parking garage.

The Schiller Del Grande Restaurant Group, best known as the creators of Cafe Annie, operates two restaurants on site.  The Grove serves lunch and dinner in a "signature restaurant" setting, while The Lake House offers casual fare.

On occasions Discovery Green has an ice skating rink.

Public art 
Monument au Fantóme - A piece of artwork by Jean Dubuffet donated by Dan Duncan was moved from 1100 Louisiana in downtown Houston in October 2007 after some restoration.  The estimated value of this sculpture is $1 million, including restoration. It was created between 1969 and 1971 as part of the Hourloupe series.

Synchronicity of Color - Nationally acclaimed artist Margo Sawyer's installation graces both exits of the underground garage, with accents at The Grove and The Lake House. The 151 panels hold 1,500 aluminum boxes in 65 colors. The paint on these boxes is also used in under water applications for oil rigs and was gifted by International Paint LLC. Some elements are kamelion car paint color and also Dicroic film, a new technology and application.
Listening Vessels - Sculptor Doug Hollis’ Listening Vessels, a gift from Maconda Brown O’Connor, sits in the midst of the Urban Gardens, an ideal setting for these serene and graceful pieces. Visitors are intended to come across the vessels and gain an understanding of their function as they realize they can hear the words of another person speaking at a normal volume, a great distance away.
Mist Tree - Hollis also created the Mist Tree, a gift from Fayez Sarofirm, located next to the playground. The Mist Tree is a -high-by-22-foot-wide stainless steel structure that is sited to attract people to the park. Visible from beyond the park’s boundaries, the rain curtain and mist streams generated by the tree will entice children and adults to refresh themselves in its delightful shower.

Planned events and uses 
Discovery Green offers a variety of programming throughout the year. All events at the park are free and open to the public, unless otherwise noted. Discovery Green presents Houston's performing, literary and visual art in its Art Series. Discovery Green's Entertainment Series offers movies, Extreme Wii competitions, and concerts by musicians that present a variety of Gulf Coast and Central Texas sounds. The Healthy Living in the Park series offers a weekly urban market and exercise classes such as Pilates, Yoga, Parkour and Zumba as well as a Hip2BFit exercise class just for kids. The Families & Children Series offers hands-on workshops and activities suitable for children and their parents.

On weekends, families can visit the park, put their pets in one of two dog runs and watch their kids play on the playground while they discard their newspapers and cans into recycling bins.

The park has additionally hosted major seasonal theme events, including outdoor exploration, kid-friendly entertainment, and charity donations.

See also

Urban parks

Notes

External links

 Discovery Green website
 Dubuffet Website
 Margo Sawyer Website
 Hargreaves Associates

Parks in Houston
Urban public parks
Public art in the United States
2008 establishments in Texas
Downtown Houston